Fog Lake is a lake in Mille Lacs County, in the U.S. state of Minnesota. The lake is just east of US Route 169 approximately one mile north of Princeton.

Fog Lake was named for Frederick A. Fogg, a pioneer settler.

See also
List of lakes in Minnesota

References

Lakes of Minnesota
Lakes of Mille Lacs County, Minnesota